The MACS M3 .50 BMG heavy sniper rifle is a rifle manufactured in Croatia since 1991.
The version of the previous model MACS M2-A has been enhanced, and 
This rifle is intended for action by live power, unshielded and lightly-armed vehicles, ground planes, radar and other communication antennas and systems. It is also used for the elimination of enemy snipers, the destruction of unexploded ordnance and the like. The most effective results are achieved at distances up to 1500 m.

It is essentially the MACS-M2A  reconfigured into a bullpup layout by moving the butt stock assembly forward so that the bolt action protrudes well to the rear. This has been done to reduce the overall length to 1.11 m and reduce the weight, with bipod and optical sight, to 8.8 kg. Many of the components, including the manual bolt action and the optical sights, remain the same as those on the MACS M2A, although the barrel length has been reduced slightly. The ballistic performance of the MACS M3 remains similar to that of the MACS M2A. This rifle can only be fired from the right shoulder.

Variants
MACS M2
MACS M2A
MACS M3
MACS M4

Facts
.50 MACS M3, MACS M2
 Type: Anti-material rifle
 Place of origin:  Croatia
 In service: 1991–present
 Used by: Croatia, Slovenia, Bosnia and Herzegovina, Romania
 Produced: 1991–present
 Variants: MACS M3, MACS M2

Specification 

 Weight: 12 kg
 Cartridge: .50 Browning Machine Gun
 Action: Single shot, bolt action

References

12.7 mm sniper rifles
Single-shot bolt-action rifles 
Bullpup rifles